Local elections were held for provincial and municipal posts throughout the Philippine archipelago starting May 7, 1899. The first local elections under the American occupation were held in Baliuag, Bulacan, supervised by US General Henry W. Lawton.

External links 
Official website of the Commission on Elections

1899, local
Local elections